White Cap Mountain is a mountain located in Franklin County, Maine, about  east of the Canada–US border with Québec. White Cap Mountain is flanked to the south by Kennebago Divide Mountain.

White Cap Mountain stands within the watershed of the upper Androscoggin River, which drains into Merrymeeting Bay, the estuary of the Kennebec River, and then into the Gulf of Maine. The north face of White Cap Mountain drains via a stream into the Kennebago River, then into Cupsuptic Lake, through a series of lakes into the Rapid River and Umbagog Lake, the source of the Androscoggin River. The southeast end of White Cap drains into Bear Brook, and then into the Kennebago River. The southwest side of White Cap drains into Porter Brook, then into the Cupsuptic River and Cupsuptic Lake.

See also 
 List of mountains in Maine
 New England Hundred Highest

References

Mountains of Franklin County, Maine
New England Hundred Highest